Sturisomatichthys kneri is a species of armored catfish endemic to Venezuela where it occurs in the Lake Maracaibo drainage. The species grows to a length of  SL.

References

Harttiini
Fish of Venezuela
Endemic fauna of Venezuela
Fish described in 2005